Chikhali is a village in the Sangameshwar taluka of Ratnagiri district in Maharashtra State, India. Chikhli is other variation for the same name.

Transportation
Sangameshwar railway station is the closest railway station to Chikhali. Ratnagiri railway station are the railway stations reachable from nearby towns.

Ratnagiri and Chiplun are the nearest towns to Chikhali which have road connectivity.

References

Villages in Ratnagiri district